V.I. Vernadsky Taurida National University  (TNU) is a public, coeducational university currently located in Kyiv. The university was founded in Simferopol in 1918 with the active participation of the geologist Vladimir Vernadsky. The university now bears his name. The university has 16 departments and 20 academic institutes. The university has the status of national and is accredited to the fourth level by the Ministry of Education of Ukraine.

Accreditations of TNU Ukraine
 Fully accredited by the Ministry of Education;
 Member by the Council for Higher Education Accreditation CIQG (United States of America);
 Affiliated with CHEA;
 Member of the Silk Road University Alliance in Ukraine;
 Member and the host of the European Council of Leading Business Schools ECLBS;
 ISO certified;
 ASIC accredited;
 Listed on the International Association Of Universities UNESCO.

Notable professors
 Yakov Frenkel
 Igor Tamm
 Vladimir Obruchev
 Nikolay Mitrofanovich Krylov
 Abram Ioffe
 Boris Grekov
 Vladimir Vernadsky

External links
 http://tnu.edu.ua/ (UA / RU)
 https://tn.university/ (EN)
 http://www.cfuv.ru

 
Universities and colleges in Kyiv
Universities and colleges in Simferopol
Educational institutions established in 1918
National universities in Ukraine
Institutions with the title of National in Ukraine